Lenoir Community College (LCC) is a public community college in Lenoir County, North Carolina. LCC's main campus is located in the city of Kinston in Lenoir County and it has satellite institutions in Greene and Jones counties. It is part of the North Carolina Community College System. LCC serves approximately 3,500 curriculum students and 12,500 extension students annually.

References

External links 
 Official website

Two-year colleges in the United States
North Carolina Community College System colleges
Universities and colleges accredited by the Southern Association of Colleges and Schools
Education in Lenoir County, North Carolina
Education in Greene County, North Carolina
Education in Jones County, North Carolina
Buildings and structures in Lenoir County, North Carolina
NJCAA athletics